Zdzisław Jan Trojanowski (27 May 1928 – 20 March 2006) was a Polish ice hockey player. He played for Legia Warsaw and was a member of the Polish national team at the 1952 Winter Olympics.

External links

1928 births
2006 deaths
Ice hockey players at the 1952 Winter Olympics
Legia Warsaw (ice hockey) players
Olympic ice hockey players of Poland
People from Khodoriv
Polish ice hockey forwards